Antonio Virgili (born in Naples, 1957) is an Italian social sciences and integrative medicine professor, researcher, and consultant. He is the scientific director of the Italian Institute of Social Sciences, president of the Centro Studi Internazionali, president of Corpo Italiano di San Lazzaro, and vice president of the Lazarus Union. In 2019, he was appointed by the High Council of the Judiciary and the Ministry of Justice as an Honorary Judge at Youth Courts. He has authored numerous articles, essays, and books, and is a scholar of esotericism and heraldic and symbology studies. He is also the second Duke of Castelvenere. He inherited the title from his father, the first Duke of Castelvenere Fernando Virgili.

Education 

Virgili graduated with a degree in sociology from the University of Naples Federico II. He later obtained an additional degree in psychological sciences and in clinical psychology from the Guglielmo Marconi University. He continued his studies at various universities and institutions such as the Sapienza University of Rome, Tor Vergata University of Rome, University of Florence, the Diplomatic Institute, and further Italian and foreign centers, obtaining two masters, and earned the title of Medicine Doctor in Alternative Medicine MD (AM) and a specialization in neuropsychology. Among others, he has expanded his studies at the School for Advanced Studies of the Italian Institute for Philosophical Studies and the Baylor College of Medicine.

Career 
After a period of field research in 1983, Virgili obtained a position as a professor of social psychology and methodology of social research at the Higher Institute of Sociology. Already a collaborator at the University of Naples Federico II, he was also chairman for medical anthropology of the International Council of Integrative Medicine (Australia). He was among the founding members of the Asian Population Association and the Victimology Support International Observatory and Network-VISION as the coordinator of the department for "Stress, post-traumatic stress and DAS". 

He is currently the scientific director of the Italian Institute of Social Sciences and the Center of International Studies; Professor of neuro-social sexology at UNISED, and professor at the university centre UNILUDES (Lugano). He is also a researcher and consultant in social sciences, neurosciences and clinical reflexology.

Virgili has authored over fifty essays and scientific articles and has worked with various newspapers. He has lectured at dozens of conferences for disseminating science and collaborated with Rotary International, Lions Club International and Kiwanis.

He is a member of The Society of the Friends of St. George's, the Istituto Italiano per l´Africa e l´Oriente; the Society for Geographical Studies, the New York Academy of Sciences, the American Psychosomatic Society, the Italian Society of Economics Demography and Statistics, the European Sociological Association and the Society for the Scientific Study of Sexuality. He is the chairman of the Culture Commission at LIDU (Italian League for Human Rights) and one of the international vice presidents of the Lazarus Union (International NGO). 

As an artist he has exhibited his photos in New York, Paris, Malta, Tokyo etc.

Honors and awards 
 Bagrationi Dynasty (Royal House of Georgia): Knight Grand Cross of the Order of the Eagle of Georgia
 House of Braganza: Commander of the Order of Saint Michael of the Wing
 House of Savoy: Knight of the Royal Civil Order of Savoy
 House of Bourbon-Two Sicilies: Bronze Medal of Merit of the Two Sicilian Sacred Military Constantinian Order of Saint George

Books 
 Modernizzazione e transizione demografica, ISS, Napoli, 1982
 Il personale delle Unità Sanitarie Locali in Campania (co-autore), CNITE, Roma, 1984
 La contraccezione nelle adolescenti" (co-autore con F. ferraro), Ricerca Medica Ed., 1984
 Trasformazioni urbane e domanda di integrazione spaziale: il caso della 167 di Secondigliano (co-autore), LAN/FORMEZ, Napoli, 1985
 Saggi scelti, Ed. Accad. Pontzen, Napoli, 1996
 L´Øresund: regione transfrontaliera della nuova Europa, Mem. Geografiche, Univ. Firenze, 1996
 Itinerari di scienze sociali, Ed. CSI, Napoli, 1999
 Storia dell'Ordine militare e ospedaliere di San Giovanni d'Acri e San Tommaso, Ediz. Anselmi, Napoli, 1999 
 New perspectives in teaching activity: artificial environments and new technologies, Working Papers, Arion, 2001 
 La rivoluzione silenziosa, Ed. CSI/Anselmi, Napoli, 2002. 
 La bottega dei saperi: percorsi tra storia e geografia (co-autore), Ediz. IRRE, Napoli, 2002
 Il fantasma del localismo, Ummarino Editore, Napoli, 2003
 Aspetti dell'eredità bizantina, Ed. OSS/CSI, Napoli 2003
 La formazione a distanza, Ed. CERGE, Napoli 2004
 La tradizione napoleonica, Ed. CSI, Napoli, 2005. 
 Lessons of Clinical Reflexology, RS Ed., (I ed.), 2007
 Culti misterici ed orientali a Pompei, Gangemi, Roma, 2008. 
 Prevenzione, benessere e medicina integrativa,  (Dispense corso seminariale), Ediz. El., 2010
 Nuove frontiere della ricerca psico-socio-sanitaria,  (Dispense corso seminariale)  Ediz. El., 2011
 Benessere e prevenzione: l'apporto delle neuroscienze,  (Dispense corso seminariale)  Ediz. El., 2012
 Stress e sistemi corporei nell'approccio pnei, CSI, Napoli, 2013
 Diffusione e sintomatologia dei disturbi da stress post-traumatico, Aggiornamenti di studio, 2013
 Dalle relazioni mente corpo alle relazioni interpersonali, (Dispense corso seminariale)  Ediz.El, 2014
 Neurosociologia e neuroscienze applicate, CSI, Napoli, 2014

References 

A Guide to Masters, CSO, Milan, 1996
A Guide to Masters, CSO, Milan, 1997
Marquis Who'Who in the World, NJ, 1997

1957 births
Italian psychologists
Living people
University of Naples Federico II alumni
Academic staff of the University of Naples Federico II
People from Naples